The 2016–17 season was Burnley's 135th competitive season and their first season back in the Premier League, just one campaign after their relegation in 2014–15. Along with the Premier League, the club also competed in the FA Cup and Football League Cup. The season covers the period from 1 July 2016 to 30 June 2017.

Burnley finished 16th in the table, avoiding relegation for the first time in the Premier League era.

Match details

Premier League

League table

Matches

FA Cup

EFL Cup

Transfers

In

 Brackets around club names denote the player's contract with that club had expired before he joined Burnley.

Out

 Brackets around club names denote the player joined that club after his Burnley contract expired.

Loan in

Loan out

Appearances and goals
Source:
Numbers in parentheses denote appearances as substitute.
Players with names struck through and marked  left the club during the playing season.
Players with names in italics and marked * were on loan from another club for the whole of their season with Burnley.
Players listed with no appearances have been in the matchday squad but only as unused substitutes.
Key to positions: GK – Goalkeeper; DF – Defender; MF – Midfielder; FW – Forward

See also
List of Burnley F.C. seasons

References

Burnley F.C. seasons
Burnley